Miguel Ángel Olivo Castro (born June 19, 1988), better known by the ring name Daga, is a Mexican professional wrestler. He is a former AAA Latin American Champion and AAA World Cruiserweight Champion. He has also worked for Lucha Underground and Impact Wrestling.

Professional wrestling career

Early career (2008–2011)
Daga made his pro wrestling debut in 2008, wrestling for Profesionales de la Lucha Libre Mexicana (PROLLM) and freelance shows in Coacalco de Berriozábal. He then made his International Wrestling Revolution Group debut in 2009. He spent the next two years in the promotion. Also, Daga worked with other independent promotions, like Toryumon Mexico, International Wrestling League and Desastre Total Ultraviolento. On September 25, 2010, Daga won his first pro wrestling championship, the IWL Internet Championship. On December 18, 2010, Daga participated in a tournament to crown the first DTU Alto Impacto Champion, but he was defeated by Flamita.

Lucha Libre AAA Worldwide (2011–2017)
Daga made his first appearance in Lucha Libre AAA Worldwide in 2011. In 2012, Daga became a regular wrestler, working with Los Perros del Mal or La Sociedad stables. At Héroes Inmortales VI, he participated in the Copa Antonio Peña Royal Rumble, but was defeated by El Texano Jr. At Guerra de Titanes, Daga won a six-way Ladder match to win the AAA World Cruiserweight Championship. He retained the title for 623 days. At Rey De Reyes participated in a match for the recently created title AAA Fusion Championship, but he was defeated by Fénix. At Triplemanía XXI, Los Perros del Mal (Daga and Psicosis) tried to win the vacant AAA World Tag Team Championship, but they failed. At Héroes Inmortales VII he participated in a fatal four-way for the Copa Antonio Peña, but was defeated by El Hijo del Fantasma. At Rey de Reyes, Daga had his first AAA defense for the Cruiserweight title, defeating Argenis, Australian Suicide and Super Fly. At TripleMania XXII, Daga participated in a ten-man unification match between the Cruiserweight championship and the AAA Fusion Championship (held by Fenix), which was won by El Hijo del Fantasma. At Verano de Escándalo 2015, Daga participated in a ten-way match for the Alas de Oro ("Wings of Gold"). However, he was defeated by Drago. In 2015, Daga focused on the tag team division with various partners. At Héroes Inmortales IX, Daga and Steve Pain tried to win the AAA World Tag Team Championship from Los Perros del Mal (Pentagón Jr. and Joe Líder). However, the winners were Los Güeros del Cielo (Angélico and Jack Evans). On February 19, 2016, Los Perros del Mal (Daga and Taya Valkyrie) faced Pentagón Jr., one-half of the AAA World Mixed Tag Team Champions. However, Pentagon retained the title. Four days later, at Rey de Reyes, Los Perros del Mal (Daga and Joe Líder) faced the World Tag Team Champions Averno and Chessman and Argenis and Australian Suicide in a Tables, Ladders and Chairs match. However, the champions retained the titles. At Triplemanía XXIV, Daga participated in a 12-man battle royal for the Copa Triplemanía, but was the last man eliminated from the match as rival Australian Suicide won the Copa Triplemanía. At Héroes Inmortales X, Daga defeated Australian Suicide in a Lucha de Apuestas, hair vs mask match.

During a January 21, 2017 for The Crash promotion, Daga, Pentagón Jr. and Garza Jr. all came to the ring and later confirmed that they had left AAA only one day after all appearing at AAA's 2017 Guerra de Titanes show. As Daga had been using that name prior to joining AAA, he was also able to continue using it afterwards. The three hoped to able to use the Perros del Mal name on the independent circuit, but were unable to obtain the right and on January 24, Daga announced he was leaving the group. On January 27, 2017, Daga, Garza, Pentagon Jr. and Fénix el Rey announced the formation of a new stable named La Rebelión ("The Rebellion").

Independent circuit (2017–2019)
At the end of Season 3 of Lucha Underground, Daga was seen as part of Kobra Moon's Reptile Tribe. He made his return in June 2018, during the Aztec Warfare IV. On February 5, 2019, Major League Wrestling (MLW) revealed that Daga would start appearing for their company on a regular basis starting in March 2019. He had one previous match for the promotion, against Low Ki that took place in 2018. However, MLW released Daga in June.

Return to AAA (2019–2021)
On March 16 in Rey de Reyes, Daga returned to AAA after two years outside the company teaming up with Taya and Joe Líder as Los Perros del Mal where they fell defeated against El Nuevo Poder del Norte (Mocho Cota Jr., Carta Brava Jr. & Tito Santana) after leaving the team. On June 16 at Verano de Escandalo, Daga along with his girlfriend Tessa Blanchard were defeated by Laredo Kid and Taya. On July 6 in Zapopan, Daga had a chance for the AAA Latin American Championship against Drago, but fell disqualified after using the brass knuckles. On August 3 at Triplemanía XXVII, Daga participated in the Battle Royal for the Triplemanía Cup where he was eliminated and won by Pagano. At Héroes Inmortales XIII, Daga defeated Drago to win the title. Daga would vacated the title on April 24, 2021.

Impact Wrestling (2019–2020)
Daga made his debut for Impact on the February 1, 2019, episode of Impact Wrestling where Daga and The Latin American Xchange (Santana and Ortiz) lost to The Lucha Bros (Fénix and Pentagón Jr.) and Rey Horus in a six-man tag team match. At United We Stand, Team Lucha Underground (Daga, Aerostar, Drago and Marty The Moth Martínez) defeated Team Impact (Brian Cage, Eddie Edwards, Moose, and Tommy Dreamer). On the August 9 episode of Impact Wrestling, Daga and Ortiz representing LAX, lost to The North (Ethan Page and Josh Alexander) in a match for the Impact World Tag Team Championship. On the October 4 episode of Impact Wrestling, Daga defeated Chris Bey. During the COVID Pandemic in 2020, Olivo and his girlfriend Tessa Blanchard stayed in Mexico and didn't appear during the following months in Impact shows. On October 20, 2020, it was reported that he was released from his Impact contract, per his request.

Pro Wrestling Noah (2023–present)

Personal life 
On November 20, 2019, Daga and Tessa Blanchard confirmed their engagement. The couple married in August 2020. They announced their separation on January 9th, 2023.

Championships and accomplishments

 DDT Pro-Wrestling
 Ironman Heavymetalweight Championship (1 time)
Lucha Libre AAA Worldwide
AAA World Cruiserweight Championship (1 time)
AAA Latin American Championship (1 time)
AAA Quien Pinta Para La Corona (2011)
International Wrestling League
IWL International Junior Heavyweight Championship (1 time)
IWL Internet Championship (1 time)
Laredo Wrestling Alliance
LWA Heavyweight Championship (1 time)
Mucha Lucha Atlanta
MLA Global Championship (1 time)
Lucha Underground
Lucha Underground Trios Championship (1 time) – with Kobra Moon and Jeremiah Snake
Pro Wrestling Element
Pro Wrestling Element Championship (1 time, current, San Antonio TX)
Pro Wrestling Illustrated
Ranked No. 129 of the top 500 wrestlers in the PWI 500 in 2020
Xplosion Nacional de Lucha Libre
X-LAW Junior Heavyweight Championship (1 time)

Luchas de Apuestas record

Notes

References

External links

 AAA profile
 Impact Wrestling profile

1988 births
Living people
Mexican male professional wrestlers
Sportspeople from the State of Mexico
People from Coacalco de Berriozábal
AAA Latin American Champions
AAA World Cruiserweight Champions
Lucha Underground Trios Champions